Brent Adam Cookson (born September 7, 1969) is a former professional baseball outfielder. He played parts of two seasons in Major League Baseball and parts of two seasons in the Korea Baseball Organization.

External links

Career statistics and player information from Korea Baseball Organization

1969 births
Living people
Albuquerque Dukes players
American expatriate baseball players in Mexico
American expatriate baseball players in South Korea
Arizona League Athletics players
Baseball players from California
Broncos de Reynosa players
Clinton Giants players
Guerreros de Oaxaca players
Kansas City Royals players
KBO League outfielders
Iowa Cubs players
Las Vegas 51s players
LG Twins players
Long Beach State Dirtbags baseball players
Los Angeles Dodgers players
Major League Baseball left fielders
Mexican League baseball left fielders
Omaha Royals players
Pawtucket Red Sox players
People from Van Nuys, Los Angeles
Phoenix Firebirds players
San Jose Giants players
Shreveport Captains players
Southern Oregon A's players
Tucson Sidewinders players